Jose Sifuentes (born 1978) is an American serial killer who raped and strangled three women to death in Dallas from 1998 to 2003. Although he was arrested for the final murder that same year, he posted bail and fled to Mexico, where he spent the next sixteen years in hiding. He was located by the FBI in 2019 and was brought back to the United States in 2020. In 2021 he pleaded guilty to the murders and was sentenced to life imprisonment.

Murders 
At the time of the killings, Sifuentes worked at an auto repair shop as a mechanic. Each woman he murdered he had befriended at bars or clubs and convinced them to come home with him. He then proceeded to strip, rape, and kill them.

Maria Perales – on February 15, 1998, an Old East Dallas resident stumbled upon the nude body of 20-year-old Maria de Lourdes Perales. Police early on determined that whoever had killed her had previously sexually assaulted her and then strangled her to death. They also determined that the killer had used their car to run over her dead body.

Erica Hernandez – On June 27, 1998, the nude body of 23-year-old Erica Olivia Hernandez was found lying in a gravel pit in northwestern Dallas along Harry Hines Boulevard. She was determined to have also been raped and strangled.

Veronica Hernandez – On May 16, 2003, the partially nude body of 27-year-old Veronica Hernandez was found outside an auto repair shop in southern Dallas, the same shop Sifuentes worked at. During the investigation authorities received a tip from a witness who had seen Hernandez with a mechanic who had the name "Jose" on their employee nametag. Subsequently, Sifuentes was arrested, and confessed to raping, choking, and strangling Hernandez to death. In July 2003 Sifuentes posted bail, and afterwards fled across the Mexico–United States border. Shortly after, DNA confirmed Sifuentes' responsibility in Hernandez's murder along with the previous murders. However, when authorities went to arrest him, they failed to find him. They soon realized that he had likely fled to Mexico, and the FBI was brought in to investigate and declared Sifuentes a fugitive from justice.

Arrest in Mexico 
For the next sixteen years, Sifuentes hid out in San Vicente de González, a small town in Nuevo León with less than 200 residents. In 2016, the Dallas Police Department (DPD) and the District Attorney's office granted a provisional arrest warrant with the U.S. Department of Justice, and this gave them the authority to search for Sifuentes in Mexico. In January 2019 a judge in Mexico issued an arrest warrant for Sifuentes. In April 2019 the DPD, FBI, and DA's office successfully located Sifuentes' whereabouts, and arrested him. He was then taken into custody in Mexico City. After lengthy extradition proceedings, he was returned to Texas on January 8, 2020, and charged with the murders. On May 13, 2021, Sifuentes pleaded guilty to three counts of murder and received three life sentences. 

Sifuentes is currently incarcerated at the Clements Unit in Amarillo.

See also 
 List of serial killers in the United States

References 

1978 births
1998 murders in the United States
2003 murders in the United States
20th-century American criminals
21st-century American criminals
American male criminals
American people convicted of murder
American rapists
American serial killers
Criminals from Texas
Living people
Male serial killers
People convicted of murder by Texas
Prisoners sentenced to life imprisonment by Texas
Violence against women in the United States